Erica Lehrer (born 1969) is an anthropologist, curator, and academic specializing in post-Holocaust Jewish culture, museum studies, ethnography, and public scholarship. She is Associate Professor of History and Sociology/Anthropology at Concordia University, where she holds a Canada Research Chair in Museum and Heritage Studies and serves as director of the Curating and Public Scholarship Lab at Concordia University.

Education
She has received a B.A. from Grinnell College and M.A. and PhD degrees from the University of Michigan.

Career
In 2013, Lehrer curated "Souvenir, Talisman, Toy," an ethnographic exhibition of historical and contemporary Polish-made figurines depicting Jews (including the modern antisemitic Jew with a coin figurines), at the Ethnographic Museum of Kraków. A smaller selection of objects and media from the exhibit was on display from July 28 – August 30, 2013, at the Galicia Jewish Museum.  In 2016, she curated a new exhibition at the Galicia Jewish Museum titled "A Single Point Perspective/Punkt Zbiezny."

Personal life and family 
Lehrer's uncle was physicist Frederick Reif, who was married to Mildred Dresselhaus. Her mother, Liane Reif-Lehrer, was a Holocaust survivor and professor at Harvard Medical School. Her brother, Damon Lehrer, is a children's book author.

Awards
Canada Research Chair in Museum and Heritage Studies
Canada Research Chair in Post-Conflict Memory, Ethnography and Museology
Hazel D. Cole Fellowship in Jewish Studies, University of Washington
Illinois Humanities Post-Doctoral Fellowship, University of Illinois at Urbana-Champaign

Publications
"Curatorial Dreams: Critics Imagine Exhibitions", McGill-Queen's University Press, 2016, 
"Jewish Space in Contemporary Poland", Indiana University Press, 2015, 
Na szczęście to Żyd / Lucky Jews: Poland's Jewish Figurines, Ha!art Press, 2014, 
Jewish Poland Revisited: Heritage Tourism in Unquiet Places, Indiana University Press, 2013, 
co-editor, Curating Difficult Knowledge: Violent Pasts in Public Places, Palgrave Macmillan, 2011,

References

External links

The Curating and Public Scholarship Lab
Souvenir, Talisman, Toy exhibition website

American anthropologists
Canada Research Chairs
Academic staff of Concordia University
Grinnell College alumni
Living people
University of Michigan alumni
American women anthropologists
1969 births
American women academics
21st-century American women